Paul Ėdouard Poincy (1833 – 1909) was an artist in New Orleans, Louisiana, United States who specialized in portrait, religious, landscape, and genre painting.

Poincy was born in New Orleans, and studied art in Paris at the Académie Julien and at the École des Beaux-Arts.  His studies in Paris extended from 1852 to 1859, during which time he was influenced by Parisian artists Marc-Charles-Gabriel Gleyre and Léon Cogniet.  On his return to New Orleans, Poincy opened a studio with French-born artist Richard Clague.  He subsequently served in the Confederate Army during the US Civil War.  Following military service, Poincy had a close association with artist Victor Pierson.  The collaboration resulted in the painting Volunteer Firemen's Parade, a noted work completed in 1872.  Poincy was a founder of the Southern Art Union.

References

External links
 

1833 births
1909 deaths
19th-century American painters
19th-century American male artists
20th-century American painters
American male painters
Artists from Louisiana
20th-century American male artists